Dismal Swamp may refer to:

Australia
Dismal Swamp, South Australia
 Dismal Swamp Regional Reserve, a protected area of Tasmania

United States
Dismal Swamp (New Jersey), a swamp in New Jersey
Dismal Swamp State Park, a protected area in North Carolina 
 Great Dismal Swamp, near Virginia and North Carolina
Dismal Swamp Canal, a canal in  Virginia and North Carolina